Paravoca is a genus of South Pacific araneomorph spiders in the family Cycloctenidae, first described by Raymond Robert Forster & C. L. Wilton in 1973.  it contains only two species, both found in New Zealand.

References

Amaurobiidae
Araneomorphae genera
Cycloctenidae
Spiders of New Zealand
Taxa named by Raymond Robert Forster